The West Indian cricket team toured England in the 1923 season. The team played 28 matches between 19 May and 5 September 1923 of which 20 were regarded as first-class. This was the 3rd West Indian tour following those of 1900 and 1906.

The early weather was disappointing and little useful practice was possible before the tour started. 3 of the first 5 matches were lost but the remainder of the tour was much more successful and only 4 of the remaining 23 matches were lost.
Because of the early poor results and the lack of representative matches public interest was rather limited.

George Challenor was by far the best batsman scoring twice as many runs as any other player at an average of over 50. He scored 6 of the 8 first class centuries scored by the team and 2 of the 3 in minor matches.
George Francis led the bowling with 82 first class wickets at an average of just over 15. George John, Cyril Browne and Victor Pascall also made useful contributions with the ball.
The fielding was generally regarded as of high standard with Learie Constantine's cover point fielding being particularly commented on.

Touring team

Harold Austin seems to have taken a large part in organising the tour after the 1922–23 Inter-Colonial Tournament in September 1922. He seems to have selected the Barbados, British Guiana and Trinidad tourists. Little was known of the Jamaica players and they were allocated just 3 places.

The 16 players that made up the team consisted of:

Despite being 17 years since the last tour, two of the tourists, Austin and Challenor, had been part of the 1906 team. Learie Constantine was the son of Lebrun Constantine who had toured in 1900 and 1906. Victor Pascall was the uncle of Learie Constantine.

R.H. Mallett was the manager. Austin was chosen as captain and Nunes as vice-captain.

The professionals Francis and John were black as were Browne, Constantine, Holt, Pascall and Small amongst the amateurs.

Preliminaries

Except for the Jamaica representative the team sailed on the steam ship "Intaba" which left British Guiana on 9 April and, sailing via Trinidad and Barbaodos, reached Southampton on 30 April. The Jamaican players had arrived two days earlier.

The players practised at Lord's and practice matches were arranged including a match against the Indian Gymkhana but the weather was very cold.

Matches

Status

Of the 28 matches 8 were not regarded as first-class. These were the matches against Durham, Northumberland, Cheshire, Wiltshire, Lord Harris's XI, Dublin University, Northern Cricket Union, and Norfolk. These are shown in italics below.

Match 1 v Cambridge University

Match 2 v Sussex

Match 3 v M.C.C.

Match 4 v Hampshire

Match 5 v Middlesex

Match 6 v Oxford University

Match 7 v Essex

Match 8 v Durham

Match 9 v Northumberland

Match 10 v Derbyshire

Match 11 v Northamptonshire

Match 12 v Lancashire

Match 13 v Cheshire

Match 14 v Nottinghamshire

Match 15 v Leicestershire

Match 16 v Wiltshire

Match 17 v Warwickshire

Match 18 v Lord Harris' XI

Match 19 v Dublin University

Match 20 v Northern Cricket Union

Match 21 v Gloucestershire

Match 22 v Surrey

Match 23 v Glamorgan

Match 24 v Somerset

Match 25 v Kent

Match 26 v Norfolk

Match 27 v Worcestershire

Match 28 v H.D.G Leveson-Gower's XI

Summary

Of the 20 first-class matches played, 6 matches were won, 7 were lost and 7 were drawn. In all matches 13 were won, 7 were lost and 8 were drawn.

Post Tour

Except for Jamaican players the team returned on board the steam ship "Ingoma" departing Southampton on 9 September and arriving in Barbados on the 21st.

Averages

The following averages are for the 20 first-class matches only.

Batting

In all 28 matches G Challenor was leading run scorer with 1967. JA Small with 1169 also reached 1000 runs.

Bowling

In all 28 matches GN Francis took 102 wickets. G John took exactly 100 wickets.

References

Annual reviews
 Wisden Cricketers' Almanack 1924 (Part II pages 422 to 452)

Further reading
 L S Smith, West Indies Cricket History and Cricket Tours of England 1900, 1906 and 1923, 1923
 Peter Wynne-Thomas, The Complete History of Cricket Tours at Home & Abroad, 1989

External links
 CricketArchive

1923 in English cricket
1923 in West Indian cricket
English cricket seasons in the 20th century
International cricket competitions from 1918–19 to 1945
1923